Verkhnesyuryubayevo (Ürge Sirbay) is a rural locality (a village) in Kugarchinsky Selsoviet, Kugarchinsky District, Bashkortostan, Russia. The population was 188 as of 2010. There are 4 streets.

Geography 
Verkhnesyuryubayevo is located 38 km south of Mrakovo (the district's administrative centre) by road. Verkhnemursalyayevo is the nearest rural locality.

References 

Rural localities in Kugarchinsky District